The district of Mid Sussex, one of seven local government districts in the English county of West Sussex, has nearly 100 churches and other places of worship.  Most are in the three main towns of Burgess Hill, Haywards Heath and East Grinstead, but almost every village and hamlet in the mostly rural district has at least one church or chapel.  Many Christian denominations are represented, and a mosque opened in Haywards Heath in 2010.

Many of Mid Sussex's places of worship have been awarded listed status.  A building is defined as "listed" when it is placed on a statutory register of buildings of "special architectural or historic interest" in accordance with the Planning (Listed Buildings and Conservation Areas) Act 1990. The Department for Culture, Media and Sport, a Government department, is responsible for this; English Heritage, a non-departmental public body, acts as an agency of the department to administer the process and advise the department on relevant issues. There are three grades of listing status. Grade I, the highest, is defined as being of "exceptional interest"; Grade II* is used for "particularly important buildings of more than special interest"; and Grade II, the lowest, is used for buildings of "special interest".

All Anglican churches in Mid Sussex are in the Diocese of Chichester.  Some have their own parish, while others are part of larger parishes covering more than one village.  All Roman Catholic churches are part of the Diocese of Arundel and Brighton.

Religious affiliation in Mid Sussex
According to the 2001 United Kingdom Census, 127,378 people lived in Mid Sussex.  Of these, 75.9% identified themselves as Christian, 0.6% were Muslim, 0.3% were Hindu, 0.07% were Sikh, 0.2% were Buddhist, 0.2% were Jewish, 0.6% followed another religion, 15.3% claimed no religious affiliation and 6.8% did not state their religion.  The proportion of Christians is higher than the 71.7% in England as a whole, while affiliation with Islam, Hinduism, Judaism and Sikhism is much less widespread than in England overall: 3.1% of people in England are Muslim, 1.1% are Hindu, 0.7% are Sikh and 0.5% are Jewish.

According to the 2011 Census, 139,860 people lived in Mid Sussex. Of these, 62.7% identified themselves as Christian, a 13.2% decrease from 2001, 0.8% were Muslim, 0.6% Hindu, 0.1% were Sikh, 0.4% were Buddhist, 0.2% were Jewish, and 9.1% followed another religion. 26% of people recorded no religion. The proportion of Christians remains higher than the rest of England in Mid Sussex, compared to the national figure of 59.3%.

Administration
Anglican churches in Mid Sussex are in the Archdeaconry of Horsham, one of three archdeaconries in the Diocese of Chichester.  The cathedral of the diocese is at Chichester.

There are eight deaneries (groups of parishes) within the archdeaconry, three of which cover all of Mid Sussex's Anglican churches between them.  Haywards Heath's five churches, and those in Ardingly, Balcombe, Bolney, Cuckfield, Handcross, Highbrook, Horsted Keynes, Lindfield, Scaynes Hill, Slaugham, Staplefield, Warninglid (now closed) and West Hoathly are in the Rural Deanery of Cuckfield.

The Rural Deanery of East Grinstead includes that town's four churches and those in Ashurst Wood, Copthorne, Crawley Down and Turners Hill. The Rural Deanery of Hurst covers three churches in Burgess Hill, two in Hurstpierpoint and the churches in Albourne, Clayton, Hassocks, Keymer, Newtimber, Poynings, Pyecombe, Sayers Common and Twineham.

The Roman Catholic Diocese of Arundel and Brighton, whose cathedral is at Arundel, covers Mid Sussex and all of its Roman Catholic churches. The parish of Haywards Heath includes the town's St Paul's Church, St Stephen's Church in Horsted Keynes and Our Lady of Fatima's Church in Staplefield. The parish of Burgess Hill has one church, St Wilfrid's.

East Grinstead's parish includes Our Lady and St Peter's Church in the town and two other Roman Catholic churches outside the district. The parish of Worth Abbey covers the church in Worth Abbey and St Dunstan's in West Hoathly.

St Edward the Confessor's Church in Keymer and St Luke's Church in Hurstpierpoint are part of a united parish, Keymer with Hurstpierpoint.

Current places of worship

Former places of worship

See also
Grade I listed buildings in West Sussex
List of demolished places of worship in West Sussex

References

Notes

Bibliography

 
Mid Sussex
Mid Sussex
Lists of buildings and structures in West Sussex